Deir Ammar Camp is a Palestinian refugee camp in the Ramallah and al-Bireh Governorate, located  northwest of Ramallah in the northern West Bank. According to the Palestinian Central Bureau of Statistics (PCBS), the camp had a population of 2,229 inhabitants in mid-year 2006.

The Deir Ammar camp was established in 1949 on a plot of land belonging to non-refugee residents of the village of Deir Ammar. In return, UNRWA's installations in the camp also provide services to non-refugee villagers. The camp falls under joint Israeli/Palestinian control in "Area B". The refugee camp has 2 schools, the boys school has 680 pupils and the girls school has 735 pupils.

Footnotes

External links
 Deir 'Ammar, articles from UNWRA
Welcome To Dayr 'Ammar R.C.
Deir 'Ammar Camp (Fact Sheet), Applied Research Institute–Jerusalem, ARIJ
Deir 'Ammar Camp Profile, ARIJ
Deir 'Ammar Camp aerial photo, ARIJ

Ramallah and al-Bireh Governorate
Populated places established in 1949
Palestinian refugee camps in the West Bank